Del Valle is an airport-defined edge city of Austin and part of the Austin–Round Rock–San Marcos Metropolitan Statistical Area. It is founded upon the 19th-century Santiago Del Valle leagues, the largest granted land parcel in Travis County.

It is an unincorporated area in southeastern Travis County, Texas, United States. It has no local government of its own and no official boundaries. However, Austin has annexed portions, including the site of Austin-Bergstrom International Airport in 1990. After that, most recently in 2013, the city added more Del Valle territory to the east (8 to 13 miles southeast of downtown Austin). Recent industrial developments include those by Tesla, which has received significant tax relief from Del Valle Independent School District, rated at $60 million.

The 2010 census estimated a population of 17,139. It is located at (30.21, -97.65) with an elevation of 482 feet.

History 
In 1812, Santiago del Valle settled in the hills of Central Texas in a piece of land given to him by the Spanish Government as a land grant. The community of Del Valle, established in the mid-1870s, was named after the land grant. In 1878 a post office opened. By the mid-1880s Del Valle, with 50 residents, also had three churches, two cotton gins, one general store, one steam gristmill, and one school. The primary crops shipped by farmers in the Del Valle area were cotton and grain. By 1900 Del Valle had 75 residents. About 150 people lived in Del Valle in 1927. 

The Great Depression hampered the community, which had 25 residents in the early 1930s. In 1942 the Del Valle Army Air Base opened (later renamed Bergstrom Air Force Base), leading to an increase in the area population. In the mid-1940s Del Valle had 125 residents. In the mid-1950s Del Valle had 200 residents. In 1907 the area common school district had two schools. Throughout much of its history Del Valle was served by the Colorado Common School District Number 36 and the Hornsby-Dunlap Common School District. In April 1963 the school district was renamed Del Valle Independent #910. From the early 1970s to the early 1990s, Del Valle's population estimates hovered around 300. The military base was closed in 1993, to be re-opened as Austin–Bergstrom International Airport in 1999 which brought growth to Del Valle and Southeast Austin.

Services

Tesla factory

Education
Del Valle is served by the Del Valle Independent School District. Residents are zoned to Del Valle Elementary School, Del Valle Middle School, and Del Valle High School.

The East Travis Gateway Library District operates the Elroy Library and the Garfield Library near Del Valle.

Austin–Bergstrom International Airport

Austin–Bergstrom International Airport or ABIA (IATA: AUS, ICAO: KAUS, FAA LID: AUS, formerly BSM) is a Class C international airport located in Austin, Texas, United States (the capital of Texas), and serving the Greater Austin metropolitan area, the 34th-largest metropolitan area in the United States. Located about 5 miles (8 km) southeast of Downtown Austin, it covers 4,242 acres (1,717 ha) and has two runways and three helipads. It is on the site of what was Bergstrom Air Force Base. The airport and Air Force base were named after Captain John August Earl Bergstrom, an officer who served with the 19th Bombardment Group. The airport replaced Robert Mueller Municipal Airport as Austin's main airport.

Circuit of the Americas

Circuit of the Americas (COTA) is a unidirectional, grade 1 FIA specification 3.427-mile (5.515 km) motor racing facility located in Elroy, on the southeastern periphery of Del Valle limits, in Central Texas. COTA plays host to the Formula One United States Grand Prix. The circuit also hosts the Grand Prix of the Americas, a round of the Road Racing World Championship, commonly known as MotoGP and NASCAR's Texas Grand Prix. It previously hosted the Australian V8 Supercars series, the FIA World Endurance Championship, the American Le Mans Series, and the Rolex Sports Car Series in 2013 as well as the IMSA WeatherTech SportsCar Championship.

Austin360 Amphitheater

The Austin360 Amphitheater, winner of Pollstar’s “Best New Major Concert Venue” award for 2013, is an open-air amphitheater situated within Circuit of The Americas’ 1,500-acre sports and entertainment complex and has room for up to 14,000 guests.

Parks and recreation

 Southeast Metropolitan Park
 Barkley Meadows Park
 Richard Moya Park

See also

King Ranch
Boca Chica Village, Texas
Leesville, Texas

References

External links
Del Valle, Texas Handbook of Texas
DVISDDel Valle ISD

Unincorporated communities in Travis County, Texas
Unincorporated communities in Texas
Greater Austin